George Davy Burnaby (7 April 1881 – 18 April 1949) was a British actor who appeared in more than thirty films between 1929 and 1948. He was born in Buckland, Hertfordshire and made his screen debut in the 1929 film The Devil's Maze. He died on 18 April 1949, age 68, the same date as comedian Will Hay with whom he had previously acted.

Career

Burnaby attended Haileybury College before reading law at Cambridge University but failed his first exam - so he turned to the Stage. He made his professional debut at a command performance for King Edward VII. He formed The Co-Optimists a London concert party which was very successful. Burnaby was renowned on the London Stage and on wireless. His films include Calling All Stars, Song of the Forge, Talking Feet and Leave It to Me.

Partial filmography
 The Devil's Maze (1929)
 Three Men in a Boat (1933)
 A Shot in the Dark (1933)
 That's My Wife (1933)
 Strike It Rich (1933)
 Cleaning Up (1933)
 The Wishbone (1933)
 Keep It Quiet (1934)
 Are You a Mason? (1934)
 The Diplomatic Lover (1934)
 Murder at the Inn (1934)
 The Man I Want (1934)
 On the Air (1934)
 Radio Parade of 1935 (1934)
 Stormy Weather (1935)
 While Parents Sleep (1935)
 Song of the Forge (1937)
 Feather Your Nest (1937)
 The Song of the Road (1937)
 Talking Feet (1937)
 Second Best Bed (1938)
 Woman Hater (1948)

References

External links
 

1881 births
1949 deaths
English male film actors
People from East Hertfordshire District
Male actors from Hertfordshire
20th-century English male actors
People educated at Haileybury and Imperial Service College